Crabs are decapod crustaceans of the infraorder Brachyura, which typically have a very short projecting "tail" (abdomen), usually hidden entirely under the thorax (brachyura means "short tail" in Greek). They live in all the world's oceans, in freshwater, and on land, are generally covered with a thick exoskeleton, and have a single pair of pincers. They first appeared during the Jurassic Period.

Description

Crabs are generally covered with a thick exoskeleton, composed primarily of highly mineralized chitin, and armed with a pair of chelae (claws). Several other groups of crustaceans with similar appearances – such as king crabs and porcelain crabs – are not true crabs, but have evolved features similar to true crabs through a process known as carcinisation.

Environment
Crabs are found in all of the world's oceans, as well as in fresh water and on land, particularly in tropical regions. About 850 species are freshwater crabs.

Sexual dimorphism 

Crabs often show marked sexual dimorphism. Males often have larger claws, a tendency that is particularly pronounced in the fiddler crabs of the genus Uca (Ocypodidae). In fiddler crabs, males have one  greatly enlarged claw used for communication, particularly for attracting a mate. Another conspicuous difference is the form of the pleon (abdomen); in most male crabs, this is narrow and triangular in form, while females have a broader, rounded abdomen. This is because female crabs brood fertilised eggs on their pleopods.

Reproduction and lifecycle

Crabs attract a mate through chemical (pheromones), visual, acoustic, or vibratory means. Pheromones are used by most fully aquatic crabs, while terrestrial and semiterrestrial crabs often use visual signals, such as fiddler crab males waving their large claws to attract females. The vast number of brachyuran crabs have internal fertilisation and mate belly-to-belly. For many aquatic species, mating takes place just after the female has moulted and is still soft. Females can store the sperm for a long time before using it to fertilise their eggs. When fertilisation has taken place, the eggs are released onto the female's abdomen, below the tail flap, secured with a sticky material. In this location, they are protected during embryonic development. Females carrying eggs are called "berried" since the eggs resemble round berries.

When development is complete, the female releases the newly hatched larvae into the water, where they are part of the plankton. The release is often timed with the tidal and light/dark diel cycle. The free-swimming tiny zoea larvae can float and take advantage of water currents. They have a spine, which probably reduces the rate of predation by larger animals. The zoea of most species must find food, but some crabs provide enough yolk in the eggs that the larval stages can continue to live off the yolk.

Each species has a particular number of zoeal stages, separated by moults, before they change into a megalopa stage, which resembles an adult crab, except for having the abdomen (tail) sticking out behind. After one more moult, the crab is a juvenile, living on the bottom rather than floating in the water. This last moult, from megalopa to juvenile, is critical, and it must take place in a habitat that is suitable for the juvenile to survive.

Most species of terrestrial crabs must migrate down to the ocean to release their larvae; in some cases, this entails very extensive migrations. After living for a short time as larvae in the ocean, the juveniles must do this migration in reverse. In many tropical areas with land crabs, these migrations often result in considerable roadkill of migrating crabs.

Once crabs have become juveniles, they still have to keep moulting many more times to become adults. They are covered with a hard shell, which would otherwise prevent growth. The moult cycle is coordinated by hormones. When preparing for moult, the old shell is softened and partly eroded away, while the rudimentary beginnings of a new shell form under it. At the time of moulting, the crab takes in a lot of water to expand and crack open the old shell at a line of weakness along the back edge of the carapace. The crab must then extract all of itself – including its legs, mouthparts, eyestalks, and even the lining of the front and back of the digestive tract – from the old shell. This is a difficult process that takes many hours, and if a crab gets stuck, it will die. After freeing itself from the old shell (now called an exuvia), the crab is extremely soft and hides until its new shell has hardened. While the new shell is still soft, the crab can expand it to make room for future growth.

Behaviour

Crabs typically walk sideways (hence the term crabwise), because of the articulation of the legs which makes a sidelong gait more efficient. Some crabs walk forward or backward, including raninids, Libinia emarginata and Mictyris platycheles. Some crabs, like the Portunidae and Matutidae, are also capable of swimming, the Portunidae especially so as their last pair of walking legs are flattened into swimming paddles.

Crabs are mostly active animals with complex behaviour patterns such as communicating by drumming or waving their pincers. Crabs tend to be aggressive toward one another, and males often fight to gain access to females. On rocky seashores, where nearly all caves and crevices are occupied, crabs may also fight over hiding holes. Fiddler crabs (genus Uca) dig burrows in sand or mud, which they use for resting, hiding, and mating, and to defend against intruders.

Crabs are omnivores, feeding primarily on algae, and taking any other food, including molluscs, worms, other crustaceans, fungi, bacteria, and detritus, depending on their availability and the crab species. For many crabs, a mixed diet of plant and animal matter results in the fastest growth and greatest fitness. Some species are more specialised in their diets, based in plankton, clams or fish.

Crabs are known to work together to provide food and protection for their family, and during mating season to find a comfortable spot for the female to release her eggs.

Human consumption

Fisheries

Crabs make up 20% of all marine crustaceans caught, farmed, and consumed worldwide, amounting to 1.5 million tonnes annually. One species, Portunus trituberculatus, accounts for one-fifth of that total. Other commercially important taxa include Portunus pelagicus, several species in the genus Chionoecetes, the blue crab (Callinectes sapidus), Charybdis spp., Cancer pagurus, the Dungeness crab (Metacarcinus magister), and Scylla serrata, each of which yields more than 20,000 tonnes annually.

In some crab species, meat is harvested by manually twisting and pulling off one or both claws and returning the live crab to the water in the knowledge that the crab may survive and regenerate the claws.

Cookery

Crabs are prepared and eaten as a dish in many different ways all over the world. Some species are eaten whole, including the shell, such as soft-shell crab; with other species, just the claws or legs are eaten. The latter is particularly common for larger crabs, such as the snow crab. In many cultures, the roe of the female crab is also eaten, which usually appears orange or yellow in fertile crabs. This is popular in Southeast Asian cultures, some Mediterranean and Northern European cultures, and on the East, Chesapeake, and Gulf Coasts of the United States.

In some regions, spices improve the culinary experience. In Southeast Asia and the Indosphere, masala crab and chilli crab are examples of heavily spiced dishes. In the Chesapeake Bay region, blue crab is often steamed with Old Bay Seasoning. Alaskan king crab or snow crab legs are usually simply boiled and served with garlic or lemon butter.

For the British dish dressed crab, the crab meat is extracted and placed inside the hard shell. One American way to prepare crab meat is by extracting it and adding varying amounts of binders, such as egg white, cracker meal, mayonnaise, or mustard, creating a crab cake.  Crabs can also be made into a bisque, a global dish of French origin which in its authentic form includes in the broth the pulverized shells of the shellfish from which it is made.

Imitation crab, also called surimi, is made from minced fish meat that is crafted and colored to resemble crab meat. While it is sometimes disdained among some elements of the culinary industry as an unacceptably low-quality substitute for real crab, this does not hinder its popularity, especially as a sushi ingredient in Japan and South Korea, and in home cooking, where cost is often a chief concern. Indeed, surimi is an important source of protein in most East and Southeast Asian cultures, appearing in staple ingredients such as fish balls and fish cake.

Pain
Whether crustaceans as a whole experience pain or not is a scientific debate that has ethical implications for crab dish preparation. Crabs are often boiled alive as part of the cooking process.

Evolution

The earliest unambiguous crab fossils date from the Early Jurassic, with the oldest being Eocarcinus from the early Pliensbachian of Britain, which likely represents a stem-group lineage, as it lacks several key morphological features that define modern crabs. Most Jurassic crabs are only known from dorsal (top half of the body) carapaces, making it difficult to determine their relationships. Crabs radiated in the Late Jurassic, corresponding with an increase in reef habitats, though they would decline at the end of the Jurassic as the result of the decline of reef ecosystems. Crabs increased in diversity through the Cretaceous and represented the dominant group of decapods by the end of the period.

The crab infraorder Brachyura belongs to the group Reptantia, which consists of the walking/crawling decapods (lobsters and crabs).  Brachyura is the sister clade to the infraorder Anomura, which contains the hermit crabs and relatives.  The cladogram below shows Brachyura's placement within the larger order Decapoda, from analysis by Wolfe et al., 2019.

Brachyura is separated into several sections, with the basal Dromiacea diverging the earliest in the evolutionary history, around the Late Triassic or Early Jurassic.  The group consisting of Raninoida and Cyclodorippoida split off next, during the Jurassic period.  The remaining clade Eubrachyura then divided during the Cretaceous period into Heterotremata and Thoracotremata.
A summary of the high-level internal relationships within Brachyura can be shown in the cladogram below:

There is a no consensus on the relationships of the subsequent superfamilies and families.  The proposed cladogram below is from analysis by Tsang et al, 2014:

Classification
The infraorder Brachyura contains approximately 7,000 species in 98 families, as many as the remainder of the Decapoda. The evolution of crabs is characterised by an increasingly robust body, and a reduction in the abdomen. Although many other groups have undergone similar processes, carcinisation is most advanced in crabs. The telson is no longer functional in crabs, and the uropods are absent, having probably evolved into small devices for holding the reduced abdomen tight against the sternum.

In most decapods, the gonopores (sexual openings) are found on the legs. Since crabs use their first two pairs of pleopods (abdominal appendages) for sperm transfer, this arrangement has changed. As the male abdomen evolved into a slimmer shape, the gonopores have moved toward the midline, away from the legs, and onto the sternum. A similar change occurred, independently, with the female gonopores. The movement of the female gonopore to the sternum defines the clade Eubrachyura, and the later change in the position of the male gonopore defines the Thoracotremata. It is still a subject of debate whether a monophyletic group is formed by those crabs where the female, but not male, gonopores are situated on the sternum.

Superfamilies
Numbers of extant and extinct (†) species are given in brackets. The superfamily Eocarcinoidea, containing Eocarcinus and Platykotta, was formerly thought to contain the oldest crabs; it is now considered part of the Anomura.

 Section †Callichimaeroida
 †Callichimaeroidea (1†)
 Section Dromiacea
 †Dakoticancroidea (6†)
 Dromioidea (147, 85†)
 Glaessneropsoidea (45†)
 Homolodromioidea (24, 107†)
 Homoloidea (73, 49†)
 Section Raninoida (46, 196†)
 Section Cyclodorippoida (99, 27†)
 Section Eubrachyura
 Subsection Heterotremata
 Aethroidea (37, 44†)
 Bellioidea (7)
 Bythograeoidea (14)
 Calappoidea (101, 71†)
 Cancroidea (57, 81†)
 Carpilioidea (4, 104†)
 Cheiragonoidea (3, 13†)
 Corystoidea (10, 5†)
 †Componocancroidea (1†)
 Dairoidea (4, 8†)
 Dorippoidea (101, 73†)
 Eriphioidea (67, 14†)
 Gecarcinucoidea (349)
 Goneplacoidea (182, 94†)
 Hexapodoidea (21, 25†)
 Leucosioidea (488, 113†)
 Majoidea (980, 89†)
 Orithyioidea (1)
 Palicoidea (63, 6†)
 Parthenopoidea (144, 36†)
 Pilumnoidea (405, 47†)
 Portunoidea (455, 200†)
 Potamoidea (662, 8†)
 Pseudothelphusoidea (276)
 Pseudozioidea (22, 6†)
 Retroplumoidea (10, 27†)
 Trapezioidea (58, 10†)
 Trichodactyloidea (50)
 Xanthoidea (736, 134†)
 Subsection Thoracotremata
 Cryptochiroidea (46)
 Grapsoidea (493, 28†)
 Ocypodoidea (304, 14†)
 Pinnotheroidea (304, 13†)

Recent studies have found the following superfamilies and families to not be monophyletic, but rather paraphyletic or polyphyletic:

 The Thoracotremata superfamily Grapsoidea is polyphyletic
 The Thoracotremata superfamily Ocypodoidea is polyphyletic
 The Heterotremata superfamily Calappoidea is polyphyletic
 The Heterotremata superfamily Eriphioidea is polyphyletic
 The Heterotremata superfamily Goneplacoidea is polyphyletic
 The Heterotremata superfamily Potamoidea is paraphyletic with respect to Gecarcinucoidea, which is resolved by placing Gecarcinucidae within Potamoidea
 The Majoidea families Epialtidae, Mithracidae and Majidae are polyphyletic with respect to each other
 The Dromioidea family Dromiidae may be paraphyletic with respect to Dynomenidae
 The Homoloidea family Homolidae is paraphyletic with respect to Latreilliidae
 The Xanthoidea family Xanthidae is paraphyletic with respect to Panopeidae

Cultural influences

Both the constellation Cancer and the astrological sign Cancer are named after the crab, and depicted as a crab. William Parsons, 3rd Earl of Rosse drew the Crab Nebula in 1848 and noticed its similarity to the animal; the Crab Pulsar lies at the centre of the nebula. The Moche people of ancient Peru worshipped nature, especially the sea, and often depicted crabs in their art. In Greek mythology, Karkinos was a crab that came to the aid of the Lernaean Hydra as it battled Heracles. One of Rudyard Kipling's Just So Stories, The Crab that Played with the Sea, tells the story of a gigantic crab who made the waters of the sea go up and down, like the tides.  The auction for the crab quota in 2019, Russia is the largest revenue auction in the world except the spectrum auctions. In Malay mythology (as related by Hugh Clifford to Walter William Skeat), ocean tides are believed to be caused by water rushing in and out of a hole in the Navel of the Seas (Pusat Tasek), where "there sits a gigantic crab which twice a day gets out in order to search for food".

The Kapsiki people of North Cameroon use the way crabs handle objects for divination. Ramnath Shiv Ghela temple during the occasion of Makar Sankranti they offer live crabs to lord Shiva.

The term crab mentality is derived from a type of detrimental social behavior observed in crabs.

Explanatory notes

References

External links
 

 
Articles containing video clips
Commercial crustaceans
Edible crustaceans
Extant Jurassic first appearances